Nawaf Al-Azizi (born 10 August 1999) is a Saudi Arabian professional footballer who plays as a midfielder for Al-Jabalain.

Career
Al-Azizi joined Al-Qadsiah's youth team on 2 August 2017. On 31 January 2019, he signed his first professional contract with Al-Qadsiah. On 1 February 2020, he joined Al-Taqadom on loan until the end of the season from Al-Qadsiah. On 12 August 2021, Al-Azizi joined Al-Jabalain on loan. On 24 July 2022, Al-Azizi joined Al-Jabalain on a permanent deal.

References

External links
 

1999 births
Living people
People from Mecca Province
Saudi Arabian footballers
Association football midfielders
Al-Qadsiah FC players
Al-Taqadom FC players
Al-Jabalain FC players
Saudi Professional League players
Saudi First Division League players